Jenny Algelid-Bengtsson (born 6 March 1976) is a road cyclist from Sweden. At the 1997 European Road Championships she won bronze in the under-23 women's time trial. She represented her nation at the 2000, 2001 and 2002 UCI Road World Championships.

References

External links
 profile at Procyclingstats.com

1976 births
Swedish female cyclists
Living people
People from Kungälv Municipality
Sportspeople from Västra Götaland County